The Peter J. Paulsen House is a historic building located on the hill above downtown Davenport, Iowa, United States. The Queen Anne style residence was built by Peter J. Paulsen, who operated a grocery store on West Second Street. It exhibits the features that are characteristic of this popular late 19th-century style: an asymmetrical composition, irregular roofscale, and a corner tower with a conical roof. The tower itself rises out of an oriel window on the first and second floors. The Paulsen house also maintains some if its exterior features, including scallop-shaped wall shingles in the gables and narrow clapboards. The south gable also contains a Palladian window and the front gable a semicircular window. The house has been listed on the National Register of Historic Places since 1983.

References

Houses completed in 1895
Queen Anne architecture in Iowa
Houses in Davenport, Iowa
Houses on the National Register of Historic Places in Iowa
National Register of Historic Places in Davenport, Iowa